, also known as Yamanaka Shikanosuke (山中 鹿の介) or Shikasuke (鹿の介), was a Japanese samurai of the Sengoku period.  He served the Amago clan of Izumo Province.

In art, his portraits conventionally show a crescent moon on the front of his helmet; he was born under a harvest moon.  The crescent moon ornament he wore on his helmet was a token of good luck.

Military life
Yukimori supported the cause of Amago Katsuhisa (1553–1578), including the Siege of Kōzuki Castle. He even tried to get help from the Oda clan. Unfortunately, Oda Nobunaga only used him so the Oda army could march deeper into the Mōri clan's lands. Akechi Mitsuhide and Hashiba Hideyoshi wanted to give him reinforcements, but Nobunaga refused. Therefore, those two generals were forced into concentrating on laying siege to the Mōri and Ukita castles rather than helping Yukimori.

Eventually, Yukimori surrendered and his master Katsuhisa committed suicide. Kikkawa Motoharu awarded him with a small castle in Suo. When on the way to the castle, Yukimori was assassinated by the soldiers of Mōri clan.

In popular culture
 Shikanosuke is one of the main playable characters in Samurai Warriors 5 (the fifth game in the Samurai Warriors franchise). In Samurai Warriors 5, Shikanosuke (voiced by Yōhei Azakami) is depicted as a loyal general to the Amago clan, well known for his impressive courage and good, attractive looks. 
 Shikanosuke is a playable character in Sengoku Basara 4, where he is shown to be an accomplished martial artist and a loyal servant of Amago Haruhisa (who previously appeared as a non-playable character in Sengoku Basara 3).
 Shikanosuke is the main protagonist of the Kabuki play "Kō no Tori" (Nihongo: 神の鳥, The Birds of the Gods), in which he is portrayed as a powerful Aragoto hero and whose physical appearance is extremely similar to that of Kamakura Gongorō Kagemasa (the protagonist of Shibaraku). In this play, Shikanosuke has to save a family of Japanese storks (or Konotori) from the evil warlord Akamatsu Manyu (the main antagonist of this play). In every time this play is performed (whether in Kabuki-za (in Tokyo, Japan) or in Eirakukan (in Toyooka, Hyōgo, Japan), where this play first began to be performed), Shikanosuke is played by the popular Kabuki actor Kataoka Ainosuke VI (considered one of the main tachiyaku actors currently, known for being a renowned aragotoshi).

References

Further reading

Samurai
1545 births
1578 deaths
Amago clan
People from Shimane Prefecture
Kabuki characters